Petra is an unincorporated community located in Bracken County, Kentucky, United States.

A post office called Petra was established in 1864, and remained in operation until 1904.

References

Unincorporated communities in Bracken County, Kentucky
Unincorporated communities in Kentucky